Nosodendridae is a family of beetles, with only 67 species in three extant genera, which are found worldwide. Nosodendron, the largest genus, is found in forests and attracted to yeast generated slime on the wounds of trees, and likely consumes fermented substances as well as fungi and microorganisms. Several additional genera and species are known from the fossil record. Nosodendridae is considered to be an isolated lineage within Polyphaga, being the sister group to the clade containing Staphyliniformia, Bostrichoidea and Cucujiformia.

Genera and species 

†Basinosa 
†B. pengweii  (Cenomanian; Burmese amber, Myanmar)
†Mesonosa 
†M. scandens  (Cenomanian; Burmese amber, Myanmar)
Nosodendron 
 Nd. africanum 
 Nd. agaboides 
 Nd. angelum 
 Nd. asiaticum 
 Nd. australe 
 Nd. australicum 
 Nd. batchianum 
 Nd. bilyi 
 Nd. boliviense 
 Nd. bucki 
 Nd. californicum 
 Nd. calvum 
 Nd. celebense 
 Nd. ceylanicum 
 Nd. chelonarium 
 Nd. coenosum 
 Nd. derasum 
 Nd. disjectum 
 Nd. dybasi 
 Nd. elongatum 
 Nd. fasciatum 
 Nd. fasciculare 
 Nd. fijiense 
 Nd. glabratum 
 Nd. grande 
 Nd. hageni 
 Nd. helferi 
 Nd. hispidum 
 Nd. horaki 
 Nd. incognitum 
 Nd. indicum 
 Nd. interruptum 
 Nd. jakli 
 Nd. kalimantanus 
 Nd. laosense 
 Nd. latifrons 
 Nd. latum 
 Nd. leechi 
 Nd. lentum 
 Nd. madagascariense 
 Nd. manuselae 
 Nd. marginatum 
 Nd. mediobasale 
 Nd. mexicanum 
 Nd. moluccense 
 Nd. nepalense 
 Nd. niasense 
 Nd. nitidum 
 Nd. nomurai 
 Nd. oblongum 
 Nd. ovatum 
 Nd. pauliani 
 Nd. politum 
 Nd. prudeki 
 Nd. punctatostriatum 
 Nd. punctulatum 
 Nd. reichardti 
 Nd. ritsemae 
 Nd. sikkimense 
 Nd. slipinskii 
 Nd. strigiferum 
 Nd. subtile 
 Nd. testudinum 
 Nd. thompsoni 
 Nd. tiomanense 
 Nd. tonkineum 
 Nd. tritavum 
 Nd. unicolor 
 Nd. vestitum 
 Nd. zealandicum 
Nosoglobulus 
Ng. loebli 
Ng. smetanai 
Nosotetocus 
Nt. debilis 
Nt. marcovi 
Nt. vespertinus

References

External links 
 Nosodendridae at Fauna Europaea

Bostrichoidea
Beetle families